The 1996 Australian Formula Ford Championship was a CAMS sanctioned motor racing title for drivers of Formula Ford racing cars. It was the 27th national series for Formula Fords to be held in Australia and the 4th to be sanctioned as an Australian Formula Ford Championship.  The series was promoted as the 1996 Ford Racing Slick 50 Australian Formula Ford Championship.

The championship was won by David Besnard driving a Van Diemen RF96.

Calendar
The title was contested over an eight round series, with two races per round.

Points system
Championship points were awarded on a 20-16-14-12-10-8-6-4-2-1 basis to the first ten finishers in each race.

Results

References

External links
 1996 Australian Formula Ford Championship results table
 Image of David Besnard and his Van Diemen RF96

Further reading
 1996 Championship Results, Motor Racing Australia, January / February 1997, page 85

Australian Formula Ford Championship seasons
Formula Ford Championship